The Japan Federation of Prefectural and Municipal Workers' Unions (Jichiroren) is a trade union representing local government workers in Japan.

The union was founded on 17 March 1989 by those members of the All-Japan Prefectural and Municipal Workers' Union who did not wish to be affiliated with the Japanese Trade Union Confederation.  Instead, the new union became a founding affiliate of the National Confederation of Trade Unions (Zenroren).  It claimed a peak membership of 256,000 in 1996, which by 2019 had fallen to 138,655.  At that time, it was the second largest affiliate of Zenroren.  Around 15% of its members are temporary or contract staff, and it campaigns for their roles to be made permanent and not outsourced.

References

External links

Municipal workers' trade unions
Trade unions established in 1989
Trade unions in Japan